Jonathan Ávila may refer to:

 DJ Yonny (born 1983), born Jonathan Ávila, American DJ and producer
 Jonathan Ávila (footballer) (born 1991), Colombian footballer